Mariamman Temple is located in Irukkankdi, Virudhunagar District. Mariamman is the temple's Moolavar.

History 
According to legend, three hundred years ago between Arjuna and Vaiparu rivers, a priest filled her basket with cow dung she gathered and was prepared to go home with the basket but could not lift it alone. She asked others to help her, but they too could not lift the basket. Under the influence of Amman, the priest exclaimed that Amman was under the ground where the basket was placed and ordered them to take her out and build a temple. The villagers found the idol of Mari Amman and built the temple. Since then, Mari Amman is considered to be the deity for the villagers. 

The sanctum sanctorum is under a vimana. The Artha Mandap and Maha Mandap are close to the sanctum. Sri Nandeeswara and flag post-Kodimaram are in a line. Lord Vinayaka is under the Arasa Maram. On the west are Vazha Vandha Amman and Rakachi Amman. Pechi Amman and Muppidari Amman are in separate shrines on the northwest. Kathavarayan and Vairavamurthi are in the east. Karuppusami is in the southeast corner. Devotees worship all these deities and Mariamman in order.

References

External links 

 Irukkankdi Mariamman Temple 
 Mari Amman Temple

Hindu temples in Virudhunagar district